St. Catharines is the largest city in Canada's Niagara Region and the sixth largest urban area in the province of Ontario. It is the northern entrance of the Welland Canal. Residents of St. Catharines are known as St. Catharinites. St. Catharines carries the official nickname "The Garden City" due to its 1,000 acres (4 km2) of parks, gardens, and trails.

St. Catharines is between the Greater Toronto and Hamilton Area (GTHA) and the Canada–U.S. border at Fort Erie. Manufacturing is the city's dominant industry, as noted by the heraldic motto, "Industry and Liberality". General Motors of Canada, Ltd., the Canadian subsidiary of General Motors, was the city's largest employer, a distinction now held by the District School Board of Niagara. THK Rhythm Automotive, formerly TRW, operates a plant in the city, although in recent years, employment there has shifted from heavy industry and manufacturing to services.

St. Catharines lies on one of the main telecommunications backbones between Canada and the United States, and as a result a number of call centres operate in the city. It is designated an Urban Growth Centre by the Growth Plan for the Greater Golden Horseshoe, intended to achieve a minimum density target of 150 jobs and residents combined per hectare by 2032 or earlier.

History

Early history 
St. Catharines falls within the original territory of the Mississaugas. A treaty signed in 1782 between the Mississaugas and the British government ceded a large tract of land—which included the St. Catharines area—to the Crown for the purpose of European settlement. St. Catharines was settled by Loyalists in the 1780s. The Crown granted land in compensation for services and for losses in the United States. Early histories credit loyalists Serjeant Jacob Dittrick and Private John Hainer as among the first settlers to come to the area in 1790. They took their Crown Patents where Dick's Creek and 12 Mile Creek merge, now the city centre of St. Catharines. Historians have speculated that Dick's Creek was named after Richard Pierpoint, a Black Loyalist and former American slave, due to an oral history account and events that had taken place around that time that would be consistent with Pierpoint being the source of the name. Secondary to water routes, indigenous trails provided transportation networks, which resulted in the nearby radial road patterns. The surrounding land was surveyed and Townships created between 1787 and 1789.

After the Butler's Rangers disbanded in 1784 and settled the area, Duncan Murray as a former Quartermaster in the 84th Regiment of Foot (Royal Highland Emigrants) was appointed by the Crown to distribute free Government supplies (victuals) for 2 years to the resettled Loyalists. He did this from his mill, built on the 12 Mile Creek in Power Glen. After his death in 1786, his holdings were forfeited to merchant Robert Hamilton of Queenston. Hamilton tried to operate for profit the already well-established Murray's Distribution Centre and Mill under the management of his cousin. Among other ventures, Hamilton became land wealthy, expropriating lands from subsistence Loyalist settlers who were incapable of settling their debts. Murray's distribution centre, later Hamilton's warehouse, and its location have long been a mystery. Hamilton's major profits were derived from transhipping supplies for the military and civic establishments from his Queenston enterprise, not from charitably supplying the subsistence Loyalist settlers. Hamilton lacked interest in social development and sold his business to Jesse Thompson before the turn of the 19th century.

The Merritt family arrived after this time, among the later Loyalists to relocate following the American Revolution. They were from the Carolinas, New York state and New Brunswick. In 1796, Thomas Merritt arrived to build on his relationship with his former Commander and Queen's Ranger, John Graves Simcoe, now the Lieutenant Governor of Upper Canada. The first Welland Canal was constructed from 1824 to 1833. William Hamilton Merritt worked to promote the ambitious venture, both by raising funds and by enlisting government support. The canal established St. Catharines as the hub of commerce and industry for the Niagara Peninsula. Merritt played a role in making St. Catharines a centre of abolitionist activity. In 1855, the British Methodist Episcopal Church, Salem Chapel was established at the corner of Geneva and North streets, on land granted to the congregation by Merritt in the early 1840s. The area became known to refugee slaves from the United States as a place of "refuge and rest"; it was a destination, one of the final stops in Canada on the Underground Railroad for refugee African-American slaves. During this time, abolitionist Harriet Tubman lived in St. Catharines. By the mid-1850s, the town's population was about six thousand, 800 of whom were of African descent. St. Catharines remains an important place in Black Canadian history.

At an unknown early date, an inn was built by Thomas Adams on the east side of what is now Ontario Street. It became a community meeting place, election centre, stagecoach stop, and mail delivery deposit. This was preceded by the church and a log school house completed before 1797, all on the east bank of the 12 Mile Creek at the extreme west end of what was known at that time as Main Street. This was an extension of the old Iroquois Trail and was renamed St. Paul Street by the settlers and descendant by the mid-19th century. Several mills, salt works, numerous retail outlets, a ship building yard, distillery and various other businesses were developed next.

Incorporated as a village in 1845, St. Catharines had a population of about 3500 in 1846. The primary industry was flour milling. Other industry included ship repairs, four grist mills, a brewery, three distilleries, a tannery, a foundry, a machine and pump factory. There were a variety of tradesmen, three bank agencies, and eight taverns. Stage coaches offered service to other towns and villages. There were already six churches or chapels, a post office that received mail daily, a grammar school and a weekly newspaper.

St. Catharines was incorporated as a city in 1876. The city expanded when it annexed Grantham Township, Merritton, and Port Dalhousie. There was some westward expansion, which was divided between St. Catharines and Lincoln.

Origin of the name 
Before it was called St. Catharines, the settlement near Twelve Mile Creek was known by various names, including Shipman's Corners and The Twelve. The name St. Catharines was first recorded in 1796 (as St. Catherines) and became a common name for the settlement by 1809—though it would often be spelled with an -er, or with an apostrophe before the s. The name and the spelling was standardized as St. Catharines when the town incorporated in 1845. It is not clear which Catherine the city is named after. Common theories include Saint Catherine of Alexandria, Catherine Butler (wife of Colonel John Butler), or Catherine Askin Hamilton (wife of Robert Hamilton). Catharine Rodman Prendergast Merritt, wife of William Hamilton Merritt, may be the source of the -ar spelling. An alternate theory to explain the spelling was that Catharine with an -ar was the typical spelling of the name for Palatine German settlers in the region.

Geography

Climate
St. Catharines' climate is humid continental (Köppen borderline Dfa/Dfb). It has a unique micro-climate because of the moderating influence of Lake Ontario/Lake Erie and the sheltering effect of the Niagara Escarpment to the south. This climate allows wineries to flourish. As a result, the city records numerous frost-free days and frequent thaws in the winter, although it sometimes receives heavy lake-effect snow during certain wind conditions, and micro-cooling lakeside on some spring afternoons. Summer thunderstorms are commonplace but generally less prevalent and less severe than further west in southern Ontario due to the diminishing effect of the surrounding lakes.

The complex and extensive glacial history of the Niagara Peninsula has resulted in similarly complex soil stratigraphy in the area occupied by the city today. St. Catharines was once at the base of a glacial lake known as Glacial Lake Iroquois, which deposited thick layers of clay between the Escarpment and Lake Ontario. As a result of these factors, the city's soil is particularly conducive to fruit growing and is capable of producing grapes that are used to make award-winning wines. Three wineries operate in the city's west end: Henry of Pelham Winery, Hernder Estates and Harvest Estates.

Since the opening of the first Welland Canal in 1829, the city has had four different canal systems, whether modified or newly constructed, carved into its geographical landscape. The fourth and present-day canal forms the majority of the city's eastern boundary. The first three of the city's canals have largely been buried, portions of it beside the present-day Highway 406 and near Lake Street and the QEW highway. Other remnants of the original canals can still be seen in various locations throughout the city; many remains are hidden within forested areas designated as city parks. Some residents in the region are interested in restoring the original routing of the Welland Canal through the city. They intend that the restored waterway and locks would be open to a new tourist attraction within the city.

St. Catharines was affected by the Blizzard of 1977, an event which resulted in more than 150 cm of snow, wind that travelled the speed of 110km/h, and a wind chill of approximately -45 degrees Celsius. The Queen Elizabeth Way (QEW) was closed and a state of emergency was declared. The Canadian Armed Forces was involved in rescue efforts.

Communities 
St. Catharines' development history has resulted in a number of unique and distinct communities within the city. The historical area of St. Catharines consisted of nothing more than what is now the downtown core, with the remaining land being part of Louth Township on the west and Grantham Township on the east. St. Catharines continued to steadily grow through the late 19th and early 20th centuries, eventually annexing land to the southwest that would become Western Hill and Old Glenridge, and to the east and north that would collectively become the central part of St. Catharines. In addition to the growth of St. Catharines, the town of Merritton and the town of Port Dalhousie existed as separate municipalities to the south and north of the city, each slowly growing their own residential base.

Along with the rest of Ontario, St. Catharines experienced explosive growth after World War II. St. Catharines continued to annex Grantham Township as development continued, including the large swaths of land to the north known now as "The North End". St. Catharines would also absorb Merritton and Port Dalhousie in 1961, making them part of the city. During this time, St. Catharines nearly tripled in population.

With the formation of the Regional Municipality of Niagara in 1970, the portion of Louth Township east of Fifteen Mile Creek was transferred to the City of St. Catharines. This included the eastern portion of the Hamlet of Rockway, as well as the Hamlet of Power Glen. The few remaining portions of Grantham Township in the Northeast corner of the area, including Port Weller, were also transferred to the city. With the new Louth Township lands belonging to the city, St. Catharines would begin two developments in the west end — Martindale Road in 1983, and Vansickle Road in 1987. These developments are nearing completion. There was also a push to continue further expansion to the west in the late 1990s, but this has since been halted by Ontario Greenbelt legislation.

The following distinct communities exist within St. Catharines:

Downtown 

Numerous efforts have been made to improve the downtown; the restructuring of manufacturing resulted in a loss of jobs and retail businesses. In the early 21st century, city, university, and private developers undertook several initiatives to revive downtown, related to urban design, clustering activities to attract people to the area as a destination from day through evening events.

In 2006, city council approved converting one-way arteries through the city centre to allow for two-way traffic, to make it easier for people to make their way around the city to explore it. In terms of urban planning and use, two-way traffic improves circulation within the area. The city wanted to improve downtown as a destination, rather than a place to pass through. The council also want to have downtown St. Catharines on the Wine Route, a driving tour of Niagara wineries and an Ontario Wine Council initiative to boost the number of visitors to the region's many wineries. The Wine Route was modified to officially redirect winery goers through the downtown starting in 2012. The first phase of two-way traffic was completed in 2009, with St. Paul and King streets being converted. The cost of the conversion was $3.5 million and was shared with Niagara Region. In 2012, most observers concluded that the change had achieved its goals; it garnered national media attention.

In 2009, $54 million in joint federal, provincial and municipal funding was announced for the construction of a performing arts centre in the city's core, officially opened in September 2015 as the FirstOntario Performing Arts Centre. Complementing the centre, which features concert, dance and film venues, is Brock University's Marilyn I. Walker School of Fine and Performing Arts. The university renovated the former Canada Hair Cloth Building to use for the school. This former industrial building is behind St. Paul Street and next to the municipal performing arts centre.

In late 2011, city council approved moving forward with the construction of a new spectator facility to replace the crumbling Garden City Arena Complex, built in 1938. Council voted to build a U-shaped facility, which will be home to the Niagara IceDogs, an Ontario Hockey League team, and be able to host other events, such as concerts. It would have room for 4,500 to 5,300 spectators. The goal is to keep the cost of the facility at or below $50 million and to build it on a swath of land known locally as the lower-level parking lot, behind St. Paul Street and abutting Highway 406. Council's commitment to build the facility resulted in IceDogs' owner Bill Burke promising to sign a 20-year lease with the city after he threatened to move his team if the city chose not to build a new arena.

The city has made other infrastructure improvements to the downtown. In January 2012, a new edition of the Carlisle Street Parking Garage opened. It was built to Leadership in Energy and Environmental Design standards and was certified for its environmentally friendly features, including a green roof, preferred carpool and hybrid vehicle parking, greywater collection, permeable interlocking brick pavement, and several bike racks for users. A mixed-use development, the structure was planned for retail space at street level on Carlisle Street, in order to promote activity and business on the street. The project cost $27.9 million, with funding split three ways between the federal, provincial and municipal governments. Starting in 2019, certain streets located in downtown St. Catharines have been closed during weekends to vehicle traffic. These pedestrian zones have expanded over time. $214,500 was allocated in the cities budget in 2021 for these road closures. In 2023, this initiative was discontinued.

Demographics 

Since 1998, St. Catharines has had one of the highest obesity rates of any centre in Canada. A 2001 analysis by Statistics Canada showed that 57.3 percent of its residents were overweight. This has caused some elements of the media, including CTV, the Canadian Broadcasting Corporation and The Globe and Mail to dub St. Catharines as Canada's "fattest" city. In 2008, new statistics were released that show that the percentage obese or obese/overweight residents of Hamilton (74.3%), Kingston (70.1%), and St. John's, Newfoundland and Labrador (70%) is now higher than St. Catharines-Niagara (69.3%), though the obesity rate in St. Catharines was higher in 2008 than in 1998.

23% of children in St. Catharines were estimated to be living in poverty as of 2015, which was above Canada's average rate of child poverty. In 2022, the municipality itself as an employer became the largest in Ontario to offer a living wage, an action praised by the Niagara Poverty Reduction Network.

Ethnicity 
As of the 2021 Census, 16.5% of residents were visible minorities, 2.5% had Indigenous identity, and the remaining 81.0% were White. The largest visible minority groups were Black (4.1%), South Asian (2.5%), Latin American (2.3%), Chinese (1.6%), Filipino (1.5%) and Arab (1.3%).

Note: Totals greater than 100% due to multiple origin responses.

Religion 
In 2021, 58.3% of residents were Christians, down from 71.8% in 2011. 25.8% of residents were Catholic, 17.8% were Protestant, 9.4% were Christians of unspecified denomination, 1.3% were Christian Orthodox, and 3.9 were other Christian/Christian related traditions. 35.9% of the population had were irreligious or secular, up from 24.5% in 2011. All other religions/spiritual traditions made up 5.8% of the population. The largest non-Christian religions were Islam (3.4%), Buddhism (0.6%), and Hinduism (0.6%).

Economy 

Tourism was considered to be an influential factor in Conference Board of Canada's projected GDP growth for St. Catharines. The city is approximately 20 km from the U.S.–Canada border. Its economy is affected by the millions of tonnes of cargo shipped through the Welland Canal, with the locks for the canal being considered a tourist attraction by itself. St. Catharines was the location of a transmission plant for General Motors. The 20 hectare property where the factory once operated is now classified as a contaminated brownfield.

Arts and culture

Theatre 
St. Catharines is also home to a variety of theatre companies. These companies include Garden City Productions (formerly the Operatic Society of Grantham United Church 1956–1962), Carousel Players (in the Old Courthouse), Mirror Theatre, Essential Collectives Theatre, and the Empty Box Theatre Company. In 2015, the FirstOntario Performing Arts Centre opened. In 2016, the Film House launched within the space, featuring cinema screenings with themed or genre-specific nights.

Events 
The Grape and Wine Festival Parade is held annually each September. More than 100,000 people were anticipated for the 2022 event.

The International Chicken Chucking Championships takes place every January in the St. Catharines neighbourhood of Port Dalhousie and attracts hundreds of participants and observers. Chicken Chucking consists of pitching or sliding frozen chickens along the ice-covered Martindale Pond and is hosted by the Kilt and Clover. Animal rights groups such as Niagara Action for Animals have protested the event. Proceeds from the event are donated to Community Care, a local food bank.

St. Catharines was one of the cities that hosted the 2022 Canada Summer Games. More than 5,000 athletes and coaches arrived for the games, which took place from August 6 to August 21, 2022. The opening ceremony was held at the Meridian Centre.

Attractions 

 Lakeside Park Carousel – historic carousel located in Port Dahousie
 Morningstar Mill – heritage site and mill
 Pen Centre – a regional shopping centre
 The St. Catharines Armoury is a recognized Federal Heritage building, #1991 on the Register of the Government of Canada Heritage Buildings.
 The St. Catharines Museum is at Lock 3 on the Welland Canal, off the Welland Canals Parkway. An elevated viewing platform at the museum allows visitors to get a close-up look at international ships crossing this section of the St. Lawrence Seaway. Along with its exhibits dedicated to the city's history and the canals, the museum is home to the Ontario Lacrosse Hall of Fame and Museum.

Parks 
 Montebello Park: Designed by Frederick Law Olmsted in 1887, who was renowned for designing and developing New York City's Central Park in 1853. A commemorative rose garden, with over 1,300 bushes in 25 varieties, is the city's largest rose collection; it features an ornamental fountain. The focal point of the park is a band shell and pavilion built in 1888. The park is designated under the Ontario Heritage Act.
 Lakeside Park: Located in the North end, along the shores of Lake Ontario in the community known as Port Dalhousie. Hosts yearly fireworks displays on 1 July (Canada Day). Has picnic areas, a pavilion, snack bar, change rooms, washrooms, playground equipment, boardwalk, the Lakeside Park Carousel, and public docks for visiting boaters. The beach offers magnificent sunset views over Lake Ontario. Lakeside Park inspired a song by the rock band Rush which describes the park itself and drummer/lyricist Neil Peart's memories there.
 Burgoyne Woods: A 50-hectare (0.5 km2) wooded area and recreational park near the Downtown core. It also contains a dog park and is the host of annual cross country races within the District School Board of Niagara (DSBN) and the Niagara Catholic District School Board (NCDSB).
 Happy Rolph's Bird Sanctuary: A 6-hectare (0.06 km2) park on the shores of Lake Ontario in the community of Port Weller. It is home to hundreds of native and migratory birds and features an exotic collection of flowering rhododendrons. An onsite petting farm (containing horses, pigs, sheep, goats and llamas, as well as a donkey named 'Hoti'—'Don Quixote') is operated by the city from Victoria Day to Thanksgiving weekend. A trail running throughout the park leads to a peaceful waterfront memorial to Canadian victims of the 9/11 terrorist attacks.
 Ontario Jaycee Gardens: Overlooking the Henley Rowing Course, this is the city's largest horticultural park, with more than 8 hectares (0.08 km2) of meticulously landscaped gardens and flower displays. Among the displays is a memorial site dedicated to Kristen French. The park exists on land that once featured the Third Welland Canal. The former entrance to the canal can still be seen at the north-west end of the park.
 Walker Arboretum: Located along the hillside of Rodman Hall and the Twelve Mile Creek below, the original owner of this estate was Thomas Rodman Merritt, son of William Hamilton Merritt. In the late 19th century, an English landscape designer named Samuel Richardson was hired by Merritt to tend the grounds. As a result, the arboretum is an extensive, rambling garden with rare conifers which benefit from an exceptional micro-climate. It boasts one of the largest Chinese Empress trees in Canada.
 Woodgale Park: Located along Glendale Avenue between Glenridge Avenue and the Pen Centre. Features wide open spaces, flowing fruit trees, rare birds, a soccer field and tennis courts. Also features a memorial to the original farm building on the north end of the park near Denis Morris Catholic High School. Locally known as Doug Hill Park, after a nearby resident who coached a number of baseball and tug of war teams in this area.

Trail system 

The city's trail system offers over 90 kilometres (55 mi) of accessible pathways that are suitable for walking, jogging, cycling, hiking and cross-country skiing.
 Bruce Trail: Canada's oldest and longest hiking trail, following the Niagara Escarpment (designated as a UNESCO World Biosphere Reserve site) from Niagara-on-the-Lake to Tobermory. A 20-kilometre (12 mi) section with associated side trails winds through St. Catharines passing by places such as the Morningstar Mill.
 Merritt Trail: a segmented 11 km (6.8 mi) trail that passes many of the old sections of the second Welland Canal and remnants of its locks.
 Laura Secord Legacy Trail – a trail that was established to commemorate Laura Secord's 32 km walk to warn of an upcoming American attack during the War of 1812.
 Terry Fox Trail: a 1.5 km trail that runs along Carlon Street and Geneva Street. Six exercise stations are placed throughout it.
 Waterfront Trail: follows the shore of Lake Ontario, connecting communities from Niagara-on-the-Lake to Brockville. The Port Dalhousie portion of the trail is a major highlight.
 Welland Canals Parkway Trail – The trail in its entirety is 45 km, stretching from St. Catharines to Port Colborne.

Sports

Ice hockey
St. Catharines entered into the Ontario Hockey Association Junior 'A' Hockey in 1943 as the St. Catharines Falcons. In 1947, they became the Teepees and were affiliated with the American Hockey League's Buffalo Bisons. When the National Hockey League's (NHL) Chicago Blackhawks made the Bisons their number one farm team, they inherited the Teepees. In the 1960s, the Jr. 'A' team went deeply into debt to the Chicago Black Hawks, but continued as a successful franchise and were named the St. Catharines Black Hawks. The Hamilton Fincups moved to St. Catharines in 1976 and played here for one year before moving back to Hamilton. The AHL St. Catharines Saints played in St. Catharines between 1982 and 1986, before being forced to re-locate to Newmarket due to protests from the NHL Buffalo Sabres. The St. Catharines Saints served as the farm team for the Toronto Maple Leafs, and today are known as the Toronto Marlies.

In 2007, the OHL's Mississauga IceDogs relocated to St. Catharines and became the Niagara IceDogs. The IceDogs played out of the Jack Gatecliff Arena, which was renamed the Gatorade Garden City Complex (since renamed Garden City Arena Complex). In 2014, the IceDogs moved to the newly built Meridian Centre.
Since starting out the team has won the Emms Trophy in 2010–2011 & 2018–2019. They have also won the Bobby Orr Trophy during 2011–2012 season and 2015–2016 season, qualifying for the OHL Finals. They would be beaten both times by the London Knights. The team has had numerous NHL alumni including Alex Pietrangelo, Dougie Hamilton, Vince Dunn, Ryan Strome, Akil Thomas and Mark Visentin.

The St. Catharines Falcons play in the Golden Horseshoe Division of the Greater Ontario Junior Hockey League. The team has played since 1968 and plays all home games out of the Jack Gatecliff Arena. The team were runners up for the Sutherland Cup in 1979, 1990, 1994, 1997, 2000 and 2014, but won the cup in 2012.

Basketball 
In 2015, the National Basketball League of Canada announced that Niagara had been awarded a new franchise to play in the Meridian Centre. The team, named the Niagara River Lions, began play in 2015 where they reached the conference quarterfinals. The team joined the Canadian Elite Basketball League after the 2017–18 season. In 2021, the River Lions had one of their best seasons, finishing 2nd with a 10–4 record. The River Lions made it through the playoffs into the finals, where they lost 65–101 to the Edmonton Stingers.

Baseball
The city was the home of the New York–Penn League's St. Catharines Blue Jays, the Short-season A affiliate of the Toronto Blue Jays, from 1986 to 1999. In 1996 the team was renamed the St. Catharines Stompers, and was subsequently sold and relocated to Queens, New York City in late 1999, where they became the Queens Kings.

Rugby
St. Catharines Tigers RFC was formed in 1978. Beginning in 2015, the Tigers joined the Niagara Wasps RFC and play at their field in Thorold.

Soccer
League1 Ontario's St. Catharines Wolves are one of the most successful professional soccer teams in Canada, and play at Club Roma in the west-end of the city.

Rowing

Martindale Pond in St. Catharines' Port Dalhousie is the site of the annual Royal Canadian Henley Regatta, a world-class event that brings over 3,000 athletes from various nations to the city. The site hosted the FISA World Rowing Championships in 1970 and in 1999. More recently, the World Master's Rowing Championship was held at the Martindale Pond in the summer of 2010, with $500,000 in improvements to the facility such as: a weed harvester, new docking and a new timing system. There are currently talks to bring the Canadian Rowing Hall of Fame to St. Catharines sometime in the near future. The pond is also home to the St. Catharines rowing club, Brock University rowing club, Ridley College rowing club and to the annual CSSRA Championships, which draws hundreds of high school athletes from Canada, the U.S. and Mexico. The Martindale Pond or Henley, continues to hold its world-renowned status as a major rowing venue in the world. The rowing event in the Pan American Games were held in St. Catharines in 2015. Several Olympic medallists in rowing are from St. Catharines, including Melanie Kok, Buffy Williams, and Dave Boyes.

Sailing
There are marinas at Port Dalhousie and Port Weller and a club that sails from Municipal Beach. The St. Catharines Marina is at Port Weller. The Port Dalhousie Pier Marina and the Port Dalhousie Yacht Club are at Port Dalhousie.

Government

Municipal
St. Catharines is governed by a mayor and city council of twelve city councillors, with two councillors representing each of the six municipal wards in the city. A city councillor is also elected by the council as a whole to serve as deputy mayor, who only fills the role should the elected mayor not be available. St. Catharines City Council meets every Monday and is open to participation by the community. Matters put forward are voted on by members of city council; the mayor presides over council debate and serves very much like the speaker, and as a result only votes in the case of a tie. After 2006, municipal elections will be in November every four years rather than the previous three. Unlike most cities its size, city councillors only serve on a part-time basis and continue with their non-political careers in the community. Only the mayor is elected to a full-time position. St. Catharines City Hall is downtown on Church Street. Tim Rigby was the Mayor of St. Catharines from 1997 to 2006; Brian McMullan was elected to succeed Rigby on 13 November 2006, and was sworn in on 4 December. He was re-elected in October 2010. On 27 October 2014, Walter Sendzik was elected mayor of St. Catharines and assumed office in December 2014.

St. Catharines uses a council-manager government, and as a result a chief administrative officer (CAO) is appointed by council to oversee the day-to-day operations of the city and its departments. The CAO, in effect, is the highest ranking municipal civil servant and has authority over the spending of municipal tax dollars. The CAO advises council on policy matters and acts as liaison between the administrative staff and elected officials. Some of the CAOs duties include assisting in the creation of the municipal budget, and ensuring that municipal funds are spent in a responsible manner. Residents of St. Catharines also elect six regional councillors to the Niagara Regional Council on an at-large basis. Unlike many other regional municipalities in Ontario, regional councillors do not sit on city council and instead only represent at the regional level. Four school board trustees for the District School Board of Niagara representing St. Catharines and Niagara-on-the-Lake are elected, as well as three trustees for the Niagara Catholic District School Board, two for five of St. Catharines' wards, and one for Thorold and the Merriton Ward of St. Catharines. Regional councillors and school board trustees are elected at the same time, and on the same ballot, as the mayor and city councillors. St. Catharines has one of the lowest resident/representative ratios of any large city in Ontario. There are just under 7,000 people per elected municipal representative in St. Catharines, while Oshawa (a similar-sized city in Ontario) has one representative per 13,500 people. London, Ontario, has one representative per 30,500 people and Toronto has one representative per 111,774 people. There has been discussion regarding a modification of the city/regional council arrangement, with the possibility of reducing city council to six full-time representatives and having the six regional councillors serve on city council. While there is growing support in the business community for such an arrangement, city council has been unreceptive to such ideas.

Provincial

At the provincial level, St. Catharines is well known for electing high-profile members of the Legislative Assembly of Ontario. Jim Bradley was the Member of Provincial Parliament for St. Catharines from 1977 until 2018 and was Ontario's longest serving MPP. Peter Kormos, who represented the southern portions of the city as part of the Welland riding, was a prominent Member of Provincial Parliament in the Ontario New Democratic Party caucus and served previously as Minister of Consumer and Commercial Relations in the Bob Rae government. From 1999 to 2003, during the premierships of Mike Harris and Ernie Eves, St. Catharines was the only large city in Ontario to not have at least one government member representing the city, as the Progressive Conservative-held ridings of Lincoln and St. Catharines—Brock were eliminated as a cost-saving measure. Robert Welch, a long-time Deputy Premier of Ontario, represented the now-eliminated Lincoln and St. Catharines—Brock ridings throughout the 1960s, 1970s and 1980s.

Federal
Federally, St. Catharines is one of the most bellwether of any riding in Canada, having only elected an opposition MP twice in its history. Chris Bittle is the current MP for St. Catharines and is a member of the Liberal Party of Canada, which currently forms Canada's government. The southern portion of the city is included as part of the Niagara Centre riding, and is represented by Vance Badawey, a Liberal Party of Canada MP. Most federal representatives from St. Catharines have maintained a low profile on either the government or opposition backbenches. The exception was Gilbert Parent, who served as Speaker of the House for seven years while Jean Chrétien was Prime Minister.

Legal
St. Catharines is the judicial seat of the Niagara North Judicial District of Ontario, Central South Region, which represents the northern half of the Niagara Region equivalent to historic Lincoln County. The Superior Court of Justice is on Church Street across from City Hall. A satellite court is in Grimsby. The city forms "1 District" of the Niagara Regional Police Service. The NRPS headquarters are no longer on Church Street, having moved to Niagara Falls in a finally constructed new building with administrative offices and support services on Cushman Road.

Infrastructure

Transportation 

The most defining transportation icon of St. Catharines is the Welland Canal, a ship canal that runs 43.4 kilometres (27.0 mi), passing through the city. Four of its locks are within city boundaries. The canal allows shipping vessels to traverse the 99.5-metre (326.5 ft) drop in altitude from Lake Erie to Lake Ontario. The Garden City Skyway is a nearby bridge that facilitates vehicle traffic into the city. 

The main access routes into and out of St. Catharines are served by two major freeways. The Queen Elizabeth Way runs east (at 15-Mile Creek) to west (at Garden City Skyway) and Highway 406 runs north (at QEW) to south (at St. David's Road). Prior to the construction of these freeways, St. Paul Street (former Highway 8, now Regional Road 81) and Hartzel Road (former Highway 58, now a city-maintained street) provided east–west and north–south access to the city. 

Public transportation is served by the St. Catharines Transit Commission, which operates bus routes throughout the city and neighbouring Thorold. All major routes converge at the St. Catharines Bus Terminal, which is downtown within the headquarters of the Ontario Ministry of Transportation. The central station is also served by Coach Canada, with service to Toronto and Niagara Falls.

Though transportation by rail is becoming increasingly popular, the St. Catharines train station is largely under-utilized, with car and bus travel being the dominant forms of transportation for the city. The station is in its original building, outside the downtown core (because of issues involving the crossing of 12-Mile Creek). It is served daily by Via Rail and Amtrak trains connecting it to Toronto and New York City. The provincial and federal government recently committed $385 million each to GO Transit to aid in the development of their 10-Year Capital Expansion Plan, which includes an expansion bus line servicing the Niagara Region. Currently, regular GO Bus service exists to St. Catharines with a stop at Fairview Mall, allowing riders to travel either west toward Burlington or east toward Niagara Falls. A rail link with GO Transit operates during the summer months with plans for the city to be permanently linked via rail in the future.

St. Catharines/Niagara District Airport services general aviation as well as chartered jetliner flights. The airport is served by charter flights from FlyGTA Airlines and offers charter flights to Billy Bishop Toronto City Airport, Muskoka and Collingwood. It is near the city's east-end in neighbouring Niagara-on-the-Lake. Other airports surrounding the city include Niagara Falls/Niagara South Airport and Niagara Central Dorothy Rungeling Airport. The closest airports in proximity offering long-haul and international flights are John C. Munro Hamilton International Airport, Niagara Falls International Airport and Toronto Pearson International Airport.

St. Catharines had one of the first interurban electric streetcar routes, which ran between the city and Merritton and was eventually extended to Port Dalhousie in the north and Thorold to the south. Like most streetcar routes throughout the world, it was decommissioned in the 1960s, and the right-of-way has since been converted to parks and trails.

Education

Secondary schools 

The District School Board of Niagara (DSBN), the local public school board, manages 6 secondary schools within St. Catharines: DSBN Academy, Laura Secord Secondary School, Sir Winston Churchill, Governor Simcoe, St. Catharines Collegiate, and Eden. The opening of DSBN Academy was described as "Canada's most controversial pedagogical experiment in years" by the Globe and Mail, as the school was specifically geared towards low-income students. This raised fears about segregation in public education and causing low-income students to feel singled out. Proponents argued that the additional academic supports offered to disadvantaged students would raise their chances of attending post-secondary education. Governor Simcoe and Winston Churchill offer french immersion programs. Eden Secondary School, although it operates through the DSBN and receives public school funding, is also a Christian school.

The Niagara Catholic District School Board (NCDSB) manages and operates 3 Catholic secondary schools within the city: Holy Cross, Denis Morris Catholic High School, and Saint Francis.

Ridley College, near the city's downtown core in the Western Hill neighbourhood, is a private co-educational boarding and day school. It was established as a boys' school in 1889, and became co-educational in 1973.

Post-secondary 
St. Catharines is home to Brock University (established 1964), a modern comprehensive university on the Niagara Escarpment. Concordia Lutheran Theological Seminary, a post graduate institution of the Lutheran Church–Canada, also operates there. A partnership between the university and the Ontario Grape and Wine Industry established the city as a centre for cool-climate grape and wine research. 

The Michael G. DeGroote School of Medicine is a medical school operated by McMaster University with a campus in downtown St. Catharines. Prior to 2004, it was known as the McMaster University School of Medicine.

Although not a part of St. Catharines itself, there are nearby campuses for Niagara College in Niagara on the Lake and Welland. The college used to operate a horticulture-related campus in the city on 360 Niagara Street from the 1970s to 1990s.

Media

Newspapers
 St. Catharines Standard (daily)
 Niagara This Week (community weekly)
 The Brock Press (student newspaper for Brock University)

Radio
 AM 610: CKTB, news /talk
 AM 1220: CFAJ, Oldies
 FM 97.7: CHTZ (HTZ FM), active rock
 FM 103.7: CFBU, Brock University campus radio
 FM 105.7: CHRE (Move), adult contemporary

Television
The Niagara region currently has no locally based television service of its own. Stations broadcasting from Toronto, Hamilton and Buffalo are available over-the-air in the region, and the region has a local transmitter (CKVP-DT) rebroadcasting the Barrie CTV 2 station CKVR-DT. A local specialty news and information channel called Niagara News TV launched in February 2011, but ceased operations only 3 months later in April. In 2003, a local business consortium applied to the Canadian Radio-television and Telecommunications Commission (CRTC) for a licence to operate TV Niagara, a community television station in St. Catharines. The application was denied by the CRTC in 2005, citing concerns about the group's business plan and its dependence on gaining audience share in the Toronto market.

Sister cities
 Port of Spain, Trinidad and Tobago

See also 
 List of cities in Ontario
 List of people from St. Catharines
 List of mayors of St. Catharines

Notes

References

External links

 Niagara Artists Centre

 
Cities in Ontario
Lower-tier municipalities in Ontario
Populated places on Lake Ontario in Canada
Populated places on the Underground Railroad